This is a list of animated television series first aired in 2012.

See also 
 List of animated feature films of 2012
 List of Japanese animation television series of 2012

References

Television series
Animated series
2012
2012
2012-related lists